Sidi L'vovna Tal' or Sidy Thal (born  (Сореле Биркенталь) on 8 September 1912 – died 17 August 1983) was a prominent, popular Jewish singer and actress in the Yiddish language, born in Czernowitz, Austria-Hungary (now Chernivtsi, Ukraine). She worked in Romania and in the USSR. She and her husband, Pinkus Falik (producer of Gery Scott), encouraged and helped the start of the career of the Ukrainian pop singer Sofia Rotaru. Sidi Tal worked at the Chernivtsi Philharmonic until the late 1970s, singing and performing comical, dramatic, and satiric scenes, monologues, and sketches. She also worked with young non-Jewish actors in the Philharmonic, teaching them movement and staging. Some of her students later became superstars of the Soviet popular stage. Throughout her career at the Philharmonic, Sidi Tal and her group toured all over the country and traveled to Hungary and Romania. Her repertoire included works of such Chernivtsi authors as Eliezer Steinbarg and Motl Saktsier. The music to some of the songs she sang was written by Chernivtsi composers Leibu Levin and Leonid Zatulovskiy.

References

External links
 Asya Vaisman, Sidi Tal and Yiddish Culture in Czernowitz in the 1940s-1980s
 Moisei Goikhberg, Recollecting Sidi Tal

1912 births
1983 deaths
Bukovina Jews
Jewish actresses
Jewish singers
Actors from Chernivtsi
Soviet women singers
Soviet Jews
Yiddish-language singers
Yiddish theatre performers
20th-century Ukrainian actresses
Jewish Ukrainian musicians
Jewish Ukrainian actors
Musicians from Chernivtsi